In Syria the academic grading system functions with points out of 100, the minimum grade required to pass an undergraduate class is 60.

References 

Syria
Grading
Grading